First Congregational Church, U.C.C. (also known as Naponee Heritage Center; Naponee Octagon Church) is a historic church building off NE 31C in Naponee, Nebraska.

It was built in 1887 and was added to the National Register in 1982.

It is one of only two octagonal church buildings in the state, the other being the People's Unitarian Church in Ord, Nebraska.

References

Churches on the National Register of Historic Places in Nebraska
Congregational churches in Nebraska
Octagonal churches in the United States
Churches completed in 1887
Buildings and structures in Franklin County, Nebraska
National Register of Historic Places in Franklin County, Nebraska